Peter "Spida" Everitt (born 3 May 1974) is a former Australian rules footballer who played for the St Kilda Football Club, Hawthorn Football Club and Sydney Swans in the Australian Football League (AFL). He played for St Kilda from 1993 to 2002, Hawthorn from 2003 to 2006, and Sydney in 2007 and 2008. He finished his career having played 291 games in the AFL. Since retiring from football he has worked in the media.

Early life
Everitt was born on the Mornington Peninsula. For part of his childhood, he resided in Wantirna.

Career

St Kilda
Making his debut for St Kilda in 1993, the then dreadlocked Everitt became one of the Saints' best ruckmen.

Everitt played in St Kilda's 1996 pre-season Cup winning side.

Everitt played every match of the 1997 season home and away rounds in which St Kilda Football Club qualified in first position for the 1997 AFL Finals Series, winning the club's second Minor Premiership and first McClelland Trophy. He won All-Australian selection in 1997, but he suffered a collarbone injury late in the year, missing the Grand Final. He again won All-Australian selection in 1998.

Hawthorn career
At the end of 2002, Everitt was traded to Hawthorn, after too many off-field indiscretions and a lack of discipline at the Saints. The Hawks offered him a fresh start, and he became one of the premier tap ruckmen in the competition, winning All-Australian selection in 2005. He was traded to the Sydney Swans for the 2007 season.

In September 2006, it was announced that Everitt would not be playing for the Hawks in 2007. Hawthorn coach Alastair Clarkson said in a statement released by the club that Everitt had failed to reach an agreement with Hawthorn regarding his contract. Everitt had allegedly requested a two-year contract, but Hawthorn was only prepared to offer the then 32-year-old ruckman a one-year deal. The Hawks agreed to seek to trade Everitt with another club.

Sydney career
Consequently, on 13 October 2006, Everitt was traded to the Sydney Swans in the final minutes of trade week in return for draft pick 33. The trade ended strong belief that Everitt would be forced to nominate for the pre-season draft and risk being picked up by another club rather than Sydney following a stall in negotiations between the two clubs.

Everitt spent two seasons at the Swans before retiring after the Swans' semi-finals defeat in 2008.

Statistics

|- style="background-color: #EAEAEA"
! scope="row" style="text-align:center" | 1993
|
| 10 || 13 || 16 || 14 || 112 || 54 || 166 || 54 || 6 || 122 || 1.2 || 1.1 || 8.6 || 4.2 || 12.8 || 4.2 || 0.5 || 9.4
|-
! scope="row" style="text-align:center" | 1994
|
| 10 || 18 || 13 || 6 || 75 || 36 || 111 || 39 || 8 || 57 || 0.7 || 0.3 || 4.2 || 2.0 || 2.2 || 0.4 || 3.2 || 6.2
|- style="background-color: #EAEAEA"
! scope="row" style="text-align:center" | 1995
|
| 10 || 18 || 32 || 20 || 143 || 56 || 199 || 92 || 9 || 115 || 1.8 || 1.1 || 7.9 || 3.1 || 11.1 || 5.1 || 0.5 || 6.4
|-
! scope="row" style="text-align:center" | 1996
|
| 10 || 19 || 41 || 23 || 152 || 76 || 228 || 101 || 16 || 139 || 2.2 || 1.2 || 8.0 || 4.0 || 12.0 || 5.3 || 0.8 || 7.3
|- style="background-color: #EAEAEA"
! scope="row" style="text-align:center" | 1997
|
| 10 || 23 || 44 || 25 || 256 || 90 || 346 || 135 || 23 || 302 || 1.9 || 1.1 || 11.1 || 3.9 || 15.0 || 5.9 || 1.0 || 13.1
|-
! scope="row" style="text-align:center" | 1998
|
| 10 || 24 || 45 || 32 || 300 || 111 || 411 || 163 || 22 || 433 || 1.9 || 1.3 || 12.5 || 4.6 || 17.1 || 6.8 || 0.9 || 18.0
|- style="background-color: #EAEAEA"
! scope="row" style="text-align:center" | 1999
|
| 10 || 17 || 22 || 21 || 166 || 58 || 224 || 101 || 16 || 347 || 1.3 || 1.2 || 9.8 || 3.4 || 13.2 || 5.9 || 0.9 || 20.4
|-
! scope="row" style="text-align:center" | 2000
|
| 10 || 15 || 40 || 18 || 129 || 47 || 176 || 74 || 15 || 186 || 2.7 || 1.2 || 8.6 || 3.1 || 11.7 || 4.9 || 1.0 || 12.4
|- style="background-color: #EAEAEA"
! scope="row" style="text-align:center" | 2001
|
| 10 || 21 || 30 || 24 || 201 || 64 || 265 || 98 || 32 || bgcolor="DD6E81"| 569 || 1.4 || 1.1 || 9.6 || 3.0 || 12.6 || 4.7 || 1.5 || bgcolor="DD6E81"| 27.1
|-
! scope="row" style="text-align:center" | 2002
|
| 10 || 12 || 16 || 10 || 96 || 36 || 132 || 52 || 18 || 264 || 1.3 || 0.8 || 8.0 || 3.0 || 11.0 || 4.3 || 1.5 || 22.0
|- style="background-color: #EAEAEA"
! scope="row" style="text-align:center" | 2003
|
| 1 || 14 || 17 || 7 || 130 || 44 || 174 || 67 || 24 || 330 || 1.2 || 0.5 || 9.3 || 3.1 || 12.4 || 4.8 || 1.7 || 23.6
|-
! scope="row" style="text-align:center" | 2004
|
| 1 || 22 || 28 || 11 || 203 || 90 || 293 || 99 || 43 || bgcolor="DD6E81"| 628 || 1.3 || 0.5 || 9.2 || 4.1 || 13.3 || 4.5 || 2.0 || bgcolor="DD6E81"| 28.5
|- style="background-color: #EAEAEA"
! scope="row" style="text-align:center" | 2005
|
| 1 || 22 || 17 || 15 || 261 || 121 || 382 || 123 || 46 || bgcolor="CFECEC"| 556 || 0.8 || 0.7 || 11.9 || 5.5 || 17.4 || 5.6 || 2.1 || bgcolor="DD6E81"| 25.3
|-
! scope="row" style="text-align:center" | 2006
|
| 1 || 14 || 5 || 3 || 114 || 54 || 168 || 58 || 25 || 309 || 0.4 || 0.2 || 8.1 || 3.9 || 12.0 || 4.1 || 1.8 || 22.1
|- style="background-color: #EAEAEA"
! scope="row" style="text-align:center" | 2007
|
| 10 || 23 || 15 || 9 || 178 || 78 || 256 || 93 || 18 || 405 || 0.7 || 0.4 || 7.7 || 3.4 || 11.1 || 4.0 || 0.8 || 17.6
|-
! scope="row" style="text-align:center" | 2008
|
| 10 || 16 || 2 || 4 || 92 || 45 || 137 || 41 || 20 || 199 || 0.1 || 0.3 || 5.8 || 2.8 || 8.6 || 2.6 || 1.3 || 12.4
|- class="sortbottom"
! colspan=3| Career
! 291
! 383
! 242
! 2608
! 1060
! 3668
! 1390
! 341
! 4961
! 1.3
! 0.8
! 9.0
! 3.6
! 12.6
! 4.8
! 1.2
! 17.0
|}

Media career
Everitt co-hosts the number 1 Breakfast Radio Show at Triple M on the Gold Coast 2022 is his 11th year. He was formerly a member of The Home Straight radio show which aired Friday evenings on Gold 92.5 amongst other regional radio stations across Australia until 2012. He is also an AFL commentator on radio with Triple M. 

Everitt and his wife Sheree also own the travel TV show The Great Australian Doorstep, in which they travel around Australia and the world  by motorhome filming smaller towns with what to see and do. It airs on 7two in Australia as well as on the iTunes store, and is the only Australian travel TV show to air in mainland China. They also own their travel radio show of the same name, which airs on 62 Triple M stations around Australia on a Saturday and Sunday morning.

He also competed in the 9th season of Dancing with the Stars and was the first competitor to be eliminated.

Personal life
On 12 January 2008, Everitt married partner of seven years Sheree in New Zealand. Everitt has three daughters and a son. 

His younger brother, Andrejs Everitt, played 131 games at the Western Bulldogs, Sydney Swans and Carlton between 2007 and 2016. In 2022, his son Boston is part of the prestigious St Kilda Football Club Father–Son Programme.

References

External links
 

1974 births
Living people
Australian rules footballers from Melbourne
Australian rules football commentators
St Kilda Football Club players
Hawthorn Football Club players
Sydney Swans players
All-Australians (AFL)
Peter Crimmins Medal winners
Victorian State of Origin players
Trevor Barker Award winners
Australian people of Latvian descent
People from Hastings, Victoria
People from the City of Knox